Judson (Also called Poplar Grove) is an unincorporated community in Ervin Township, Howard County, Indiana, United States. It is part of the Kokomo, Indiana Metropolitan Statistical Area.

Geography

References

Unincorporated communities in Howard County, Indiana
Unincorporated communities in Indiana
Kokomo, Indiana metropolitan area